New Castle High School could refer to:

New Castle High School (New Castle, Indiana) in New Castle, Indiana
New Castle Junior/Senior High School in New Castle, Pennsylvania

See also
 Newcastle High School (disambiguation)